The United Nations Special Mission to Afghanistan was established by United Nations Secretary-General following a request by the General Assembly in December 1993.

Its offices were forced to close in May 2001.

See also
 United Nations Assistance Mission in Afghanistan

References

United Nations organizations based in Asia
Afghanistan and the United Nations